Sand Hill is an unincorporated community in Copiah County, Mississippi, United States.

References

Unincorporated communities in Copiah County, Mississippi
Unincorporated communities in Mississippi